Kurixalus bisacculus (common name: Taylor's tree frog and many others) is a species of frog in the family Rhacophoridae. It is found in Southeast Asia and southern China. Because of confusion with other species (Kurixalus odontotarsus, Kurixalus verrucosus), the distribution is not well mapped but includes Thailand, Cambodia, Laos, Vietnam, and China. Populations from Hainan were formerly treated as a separate species, Rhacophorus hainanus (Hainan small treefrog), but molecular data suggest they are conspecific with Kurixalus bisacculus.

Description
Males from Thailand measure  in snout–vent length; males from the Cardamon Mountains (Cambodia) measure  in snout–vent length. The female paratype measures  in snout–vent length. The dorsum is brown with some darker markings; the venter is whitish to yellowish white. The tympanum is large. The snout is pointed at tip and extends into a dermal projection, especially in females. All fingers have rudiments of webbing. The toes are up to three-fourths webbed. The chin, venter, and undersides of femurs are granulate. The undersides of the arms and tarsi have a row of tubercles, continuing onto the outer digits.

Specimens from Hainan possess an internal vocal sac, whereas specimens from Thailand have an external one. In light of molecular evidence, this difference is considered to represent intraspecific variation.

Habitat and conservation
Kurixalus bisacculus is found in vegetation or arboreally. The IUCN assessment from 2004 predates the revision of the species boundaries of Kurixalus bisacculus and its closest relatives. At the time, it was considered a common species that could be threatened by wildfires.

Photos

References

bisacculus
Amphibians of Cambodia
Frogs of China
Amphibians of Laos
Amphibians of Thailand
Amphibians of Vietnam
Taxa named by Edward Harrison Taylor
Amphibians described in 1962
Taxonomy articles created by Polbot